Space Empires is a series of 4X turn-based strategy games by Malfador Machinations that allow the player to assume the role of the leader of a space-faring civilization.

Gameplay
In Space Empires, the player assumes the role of the single leader of a race of intelligent beings that has recently acquired the technology required to build large fully space-based ships for interplanetary and interstellar travel.

Starting out with only a few possible hull sizes for their ships, on which they can place any number of components to essentially create a unique ship, the player can research new hull sizes and components to use with them, eventually being able to build ships ten times the size of his original hull size.

The components available to the player can vary greatly, from ship bridges, long-range scanners and shield generators to emergency supply components that, when used, will be destroyed but will allow a ship to continue moving for a longer time, and of course, weapons of various kinds, boarding parties, cloaking devices right up to Dyson sphere construction material and star-destroying devices.

The player can meet extraterrestrial races (which will inevitably happen as the player expands their realm) and conduct diplomacy with them. Treaties can be signed between two empires, varying from the basic trade agreement to full-blown partnerships and even protectorates. The player can also conduct intelligence operations, from simple information gathering missions, to ship bombs, to inciting rebellion on a planet.

Interstellar travel in Space Empires is not faster-than-light drive based, but instead relies on anomalies called "warp points", essentially wormholes between two star systems. Warp points are naturally occurring but a player can open and close these warp points if she or he has the appropriate technologies.

Games
 Space Empires (1993)
 Space Empires II (1995)
 Space Empires III (1997)
 Space Empires IV (2000)
 Space Empires: Starfury (2003)
 Space Empires V (2006)

Later development
In 2006, Strategy First acquired Malfador Machinations and the Space Empires intellectual property prior to publishing Space Empires V. Strategy First still owns the Space Empires intellectual property and has not developed another PC game.

In 2011, Strategy First released a RPG board game named Space Empires: 4X, based on the digital model of the Space Empires computer games, utilizing sprites and mechanics from Space Empires IV.

References

External links
 Space Empires Universe site, community homepage (offline) via Internet Archive
 Developer website, company homepage (offline) via Internet Archive
 Interview with Aaron Hall, the creator of Space Empires

 
4X video games
Multiplayer hotseat games
Science fiction franchises
Space opera video games
Turn-based strategy video games
Video game franchises
Video game franchises introduced in 1993